Ryan Lowry is an Australian professional football (soccer) player who plays as a central defender for Perth RedStar FC in the National Premier Leagues Western Australia.

Early life
Ryan's older brother Shane is also a professional footballer.

Playing career
Lowry signed a one-year contract to play with Wellington Phoenix in the A-League in September 2016, moving from ECU Joondalup.

References

External links

Living people
1993 births
Australian soccer players
Association football defenders
Inglewood United FC players
Perth RedStar FC players
Wellington Phoenix FC players
National Premier Leagues players
A-League Men players